Aq Toqeh (also Romanized as Āq Toqeh, Āqtūgeh, and Āq Tūqeh; also known as Āqloqqeh and Āq Toqeh-ye Jadīd) is a village in Zavkuh Rural District, Pishkamar District, Kalaleh County, Golestan Province, Iran. At the 2006 census, its population was 461, in 98 families.  

The village has two locations, Old Aq Toqeh (Aq Taqeh-ye Qadim) near the bridge over the river and New Aq Toqeh (Aq Taqeh-ye Qadim)further north. At Old Aq Toqeh is a modern mausoleum for the Turkmen poet Makhtumqoli Faraghi.

References 

Populated places in Kalaleh County